Della Jeanne Dumbaugh (also published as Della Dumbaugh Fenster) is an American mathematician and historian of mathematics, focusing on the history of algebra and number theory. She is a professor of mathematics at the University of Richmond, and the editor-in-chief of The American Mathematical Monthly.

Education and career
Dumbaugh is originally from Louisville, Kentucky. She joined the University of Richmond faculty after completing her Ph.D. in 1994 at the University of Virginia. Her dissertation, Leonard Eugene Dickson and His Work in the Theory of Algebra, concerned the work of Leonard Eugene Dickson (1874–1954), one of the first American mathematicians to work in abstract algebra. It was supervised by Karen Parshall.

Contributions
Dumbaugh was named editor-in-chief of The American Mathematical Monthly for a five-year term, beginning in January 2022.

With Joachim Schwermer, Dumbaugh is a coauthor of the book Emil Artin and Beyond – Class Field Theory and L-Functions (Heritage of European Mathematics, European Mathematical Society, 2015), concerning the work of Emil Artin and others on class field theory and L-functions. She is the co-editor of A Century of Advancing Mathematics celebrating the centennial of the Mathematical Association of America (Mathematical Association of America, 2015) and, with Deanna Haunsperger, of the book Count Me In: Community and Belonging in Mathematics on diversity in mathematics (American Mathematical Society and Mathematical Association of America, 2022).

Recognition
Dumbaugh was the 2019 winner of the John M. Smith Award for Distinguished College or University Teaching of the Mathematical Association of America.

References

External links
Home page

Year of birth missing (living people)
Living people
20th-century American mathematicians
21st-century American mathematicians
American women mathematicians
American historians
American women historians
American historians of mathematics
University of Virginia alumni
University of Richmond faculty